American singer Lady Gaga has embarked on seven concert tours. The recipient of the Pollstar Award for Pop Touring Artist of the Decade (2010s), she has grossed more than $689.5million in revenue from concert tours and residencies, with an attendance of 6.3 million, making her the fifth woman to cross the half-billion career total tour gross. Gaga has also performed live at award ceremonies and television shows. She promoted her debut single "Just Dance" through performances at the Miss Universe 2008 and So You Think You Can Dance. She first served as an opening act for the boy band New Kids on the Block and the girl group The Pussycat Dolls, before beginning her own headlining tour, The Fame Ball Tour, which began in March 2009 and ended in September 2009. Following the canceled tour Fame Kills: Starring Kanye West and Lady Gaga with rapper Kanye West, Gaga embarked on her second worldwide concert tour, The Monster Ball Tour. Staged in support of her extended play The Fame Monster (2009), the tour was critically acclaimed and grossed $227.4 million, making it one of the highest-grossing concert tours of all time. Gaga also performed songs from the album at award ceremonies—the American Music Awards of 2009, 52nd Annual Grammy Awards and 2010 Brit Awards.

Gaga's second studio album Born This Way (2011) released the eponymous lead single, which she first performed at the 53rd Grammy Awards, where she emerged from an egg-like vessel. She also performed the album's track "You and I" at the 2011 MTV Video Music Awards, appearing as her male alter ego Jo Calderone. To promote the album, Gaga began the Born This Way Ball, which was critically and commercially successful. A hip injury that required surgery led Gaga to cancel some of the remaining tour dates. She performed songs from her third studio album Artpop (2013) at ArtRave, a two-day event hosted by her to promote the album. In 2014, she headlined her first residency show, with seven shows at the Roseland Ballroom in Manhattan, New York. Later that year, Gaga began the ArtRave: The Artpop Ball, which received positive reviews, but some criticized it as disjointed. After she and Tony Bennett released the joint album Cheek to Cheek (2014), they embarked on their critically acclaimed Cheek to Cheek Tour from December 2014 to August 2015.

Gaga performed a tribute to The Sound of Music (1965) at the 87th Academy Awards where she sang a medley of songs from the film's soundtrack. The performance, considered one of her best by Billboard, triggered over 214,000interactions per minute globally on the social networking site Facebook. In 2015, Gaga released the song "Til It Happens to You", which she performed at the 2015 Billboard Women in Music, Producers Guild of America Awards 2015 and 88th Academy Awards. In 2016, she sang the US national anthem at Super Bowl 50, performed a tribute to late David Bowie at the 58th Annual Grammy Awards and sang "Million Reasons" at the American Music Awards of 2016. To promote her fifth studio album, Joanne (2016), Gaga embarked on a 3-date tour, called Dive Bar Tour, and on the Joanne World Tour. In February 2017, she performed as the headlining act at the Super Bowl LI halftime show, which became the second most-watched Super Bowl halftime show, with 117.5million television viewers in the US. A total of 5.1million tweets were made about Gaga's performance, making her the most tweeted about entertainer in the show's history.

Between 2018 and 2022, Gaga headlined her second residency show, called Enigma + Jazz & Piano, in Las Vegas, Nevada. She also performed "Shallow", the lead single from the soundtrack to A Star Is Born (2018), at the 61st Annual Grammy Awards and 91st Academy Awards. At the 2020 MTV Video Music Awards, Gaga performed a medley of songs from her sixth studio album, Chromatica (2020). In 2022, she embarked on The Chromatica Ball. During the 95th Academy Awards, she sang "Hold My Hand" in a stripped-down rendition.

Concert tours

Concert residencies

Promotional concerts

Festival concert

Performances at award shows

Performances on television shows and specials

References

External links 
 Tours of Lady Gaga  at Live Nation

Lady Gaga concert tours
Gaga, Lady